St Mark Passion refers to the Passion of Christ as told in chapters 14 and 15 of the Gospel of Mark.

It may also refer to compositions based on that text:
 Marcus-Passion spuriously attributed to Heinrich Schütz
 Historia des Leidens und Sterbens unseres Herren Jesu Christi, a 1668 St Mark Passion by Marco Giuseppe Peranda
 Jesus Christus ist um unsrer Missetat willen verwundet, a St Mark Passion attributed to composers such as Kaiser/Keiser and Brauns/Bruhns, rearranged and expanded by Johann Sebastian Bach with his own material, and in his third arrangement with some arias from George Frideric Handel's Brockes Passion, hence also known as a St Mark Passion pasticcio
 Passion according to St. Mark, one of several variant settings included in Passions (C. P. E. Bach), by Carl Philipp Emanuel Bach
 St Mark Passion composed around 1610 by Ambrosius Beber
 St Mark Passion, BWV 247, a work composed by Johann Sebastian Bach, after its score being lost surviving in several reconstructed versions
 St Mark Passion settings included in Passions (Telemann), by Georg Philipp Telemann
Markus-Passion, Gottfried August Homilius
Markus-Passion, Adolf Brunner
Markus-Passion, Jacob de Haan
Markus-Passion, Kurt Thomas
 Markuspassion, Nikolaus Matthes; first integral setting to music of Picander's libretto since its setting to music by J. S. Bach in 1731, and the first contemporary setting completely following the baroque style
La Passione di Cristo secondo S. Marco by Lorenzo Perosi
 St Mark Passion (Wood) by Charles Wood
 La Pasión según San Marcos (Golijov) by Osvaldo Golijov
 St Mark Passion  Op.180, John Joubert
Swedish St Mark Passion, Fredrik Sixten
Passione Secondo Marco,  Claudio Ambrosini